Anna de Waal (25 November 1906, Culemborg – 22 March 1981, Arnhem), was a Dutch politician (Catholic party). She was state secretary of education in 1953–1957. De Waal was the first female government secretary or minister in the Netherlands.

References
 Biography at historic.nl
 Dr. A. (Anna) de Waal at parlement.com

1906 births
1981 deaths
Dutch geographers
Catholic People's Party politicians
20th-century Dutch politicians
Ravensbrück concentration camp survivors
State Secretaries for Education of the Netherlands
Members of the House of Representatives (Netherlands)
People from Culemborg
Utrecht University alumni
Articles containing video clips
20th-century Dutch women politicians
20th-century geographers